The Bodil Award for Best Danish Film is one of the categories for the Bodil Awards presented annually by the Danish Film Critics Association. It was created in 1948 and is one of the oldest film prizes in Europe. The jury can decide not to give out the award if no deserving films are submitted. This has occurred once, in 1974. More than one film also can receive the award in a single year, as occurred in 1955.

Honorees

1940s 
 1948: Jenny and the Soldier directed by Johan Jacobsen
 1949: The Viking Watch of the Danish Seaman directed by Bodil Ipsen and Lau Lauritzen Jr.

1950s 
 1950: Susanne directed by 
 1951: Café Paradis directed by Bodil Ipsen and Lau Lauritzen Jr.
 1952: Det Sande Ansigt directed by Bodil Ipsen and Lau Lauritzen, Jr.
 1953: Adam and Eve directed by Erik Balling
 1954: Farlig Ungdom directed by Lau Lauritzen, Jr.
 1955: Ordet directed by Carl Theodor Dreyer and Der kom en dag directed by Sven Methling
 1956: På tro og love directed by Torben Anton Svendsen
 1957: Be Dear to Me directed by Annelise Hovmand
 1958: Bundfald directed by Palle Kjærulff-Schmidt and 
 1959:  directed by Johan Jacobsen

1960s 
 1960: Vi er allesammen tossede directed by Sven Methling
 1961: The Last Winter directed by Edvin Tiemroth and Anker Sørensen
 1962: Harry and the Butler directed by Bent Christensen
 1963:  directed by Palle Kjærulff-Schmidt
 1964:  directed by 
 1965: Gertrud directed by Carl Theodor Dreyer
 1966: Strike First Freddy directed by Erik Balling
 1967: Hunger directed by Henning Carlsen
 1968: People Meet and Sweet Music Fills the Heart directed by Henning Carlsen
 1969: Ballad of Carl-Henning directed by Sven and Lene Grønlykke

1970s 
 1970: Jazz All Around directed by Knud Leif Thomsen
 1971: Ang.: Lone directed by Franz Ernst
 1972: The Missing Clerk directed by Gert Fredholm
 1973:  directed by Hans Kristensen
 1974: Not awarded
 1975:  directed by Nils Malmros
 1976:  directed by 
 1977: Boys directed by Nils Malmros
 1978: Me and Charly directed by Morten Arnfred and Henning Kristiansen
 1979: In My Life directed by Bille August

1980s 
 1980: Johnny Larsen directed by Morten Arnfred
 1981: Jeppe på bjerget directed by Kaspar Rostrup
 1982:  directed by Søren Kragh-Jacobsen
 1983: Der er et yndigt land directed by Morten Arnfred
 1984: Beauty and the Beast directed by Nils Malmros
 1985: The Element of Crime directed by Lars von Trier
 1986: The Dark Side of the Moon directed by Erik Clausen
 1987:  directed by Helle Ryslinge
 1988: Pelle the Conqueror directed by Bille August
 1989:  directed by Søren Kragh-Jacobsen

1990s 
 1990: Waltzing Regitze directed by Kaspar Rostrup
 1991: Dance of the Polar Bears directed by Birger Larsen
 1992: Europa directed by Lars von Trier
 1993: Pain of Love directed by Nils Malmros
 1994: Fish Out of Water directed by Erik Clausen
 1995: The Kingdom directed by Lars von Trier
 1996:  directed by 
 1997: Breaking the Waves directed by Lars von Trier
 1998: Let's Get Lost directed by Jonas Elmer
 1999: The Celebration directed by Thomas Vinterberg

2000s 
 2000: The One and Only directed by Susanne Bier
 Bleeder directed by Nicolas Winding Refn
 Magnetisørens femte vinter directed by Morten Henriksen
 Mifune directed by Søren Kragh-Jacobsen
 Bornholms voice directed by 
 2001: The Bench directed by Per Fly
 Flickering Lights directed by Anders Thomas Jensen
 Dancer in the Dark directed by Lars von Trier
 Italian for Beginners directed by Lone Scherfig
  directed by Natasha Arthy
 2002: Kira's Reason: A Love Story directed by Ole Christian Madsen
 A Song for Martin directed by Bille August
  directed by Sami Saif and 
 One-Hand Clapping directed by Gert Fredholm
 Truly Human directed by Åke Sandgren
 2003: Open Hearts directed by Susanne Bier
 Okay directed by Jesper W. Nielsen
 Facing the Truth directed by Nils Malmros
 Minor Mishaps directed by Annette K. Olesen
 Wilbur Wants to Kill Himself directed by Lone Scherfig
 2004: Dogville directed by Lars von Trier
 Reconstruction directed by Christoffer Boe
  directed by 
 Stealing Rembrandt directed by Jannik Johansen
 The Inheritance directed by Per Fly
 2005: King's Game directed by Nikolaj Arcel
 Brothers directed by Susanne Bier
 In Your Hands directed by Annette K. Olesen
 Pusher II directed by Nicolas Winding Refn
 Terkel in Trouble directed by /Vestbjerg Andersen/Christoffersen
 2006: Manslaughter directed by Per Fly
 Adam's Apples directed by Anders Thomas Jensen
 Angels in Fast Motion directed by Ole Christian Madsen
 Manderlay directed by Lars von Trier
 Murk directed by Jannik Johansen
 2007: A Soap directed by Pernille Fischer Christensen
 We Shall Overcome directed by Niels Arden Oplev
 After the Wedding directed by Susanne Bier
 Life Hits directed by Christian E. Christiansen
 Prague directed by Ole Christian Madsen
 2008: The Art of Crying directed by Peter Schønau Fog
 AFR directed by 
 Fightgirl Ayse directed by Nathasha Arthy
  directed by Jannik Johansen
 2009: Terribly Happy directed by Henrik Ruben Genz
 Flame & Citron directed by Ole Christian Madsen
 Go With Peace, Jamil directed by 
  directed by Annette K. Olesen
 Worlds Apart directed by Niels Arden Oplev

2010s 
 2010: Antichrist directed by Lars von Trier
 Aching Hearts directed by Nils Malmros
 Applause directed by Martin Zandvliet
 Headhunter directed by Rumle Hammerich
 Oldboys directed by 
 2011: R directed by Michael Noer and Tobias Lindholm
 Clown directed by 
 In a Better World directed by Susanne Bier
 Submarino directed by Thomas Vinterberg
 2012: Melancholia directed by Lars von Trier
 A Family directed by Pernille Fischer Christensen
 A Funny Man directed by Martin Zandvliet
 Rebounce directed by 
 SuperClásico directed by Ole Christian Madsen
 2013: A Hijacking directed by Tobias Lindholm
 A Royal Affair directed by Nikolaj Arcel
  directed by Henrik Ruben Genz
 Teddy Bear directed by 
 You & Me Forever directed by 
 2014: The Hunt directed by Thomas Vinterberg
 Nymphomaniac directed by Lars von Trier
 Sorrow and Joy directed by Nils Malmros
 Nordvest directed by Michael Noer
 The Keeper of Lost Causes directed by 
 2015: Silent Heart directed by Bille August
 All Inclusive directed by Hella Joof
 Speed Walking directed by Niels Arden Oplev
 The Sunfish directed by 
 When Animals Dream directed by Jonas Alexander Arnby
 2016: Land of Mine directed by Martin Zandvliet
 The Idealist directed by Christina Rosendahl
 Bridgend directed by Jeppe Rønde
 Sommeren '92 directed by Kasper Barfoed
 A War directed by Tobias Lindholm
 2017: In the Blood directed by Rasmus Heisterberg
 The Commune directed by Thomas Vinterberg
 Parents directed by Christian Tafdrup
 Shelley directed by Ali Abbasi
 The Neon Demon directed by Nicolas Winding Refn
 2018: Winter Brothers directed by Hlynur Pálmason
  directed by 
 Darkland directed by Fenar Ahmad
  directed by 
 A Terrible Woman directed by Christian Tafdrup
 : Holiday directed by Isabella Eklöf
 The Guilty directed by Gustav Möller
 That Time of Year directed by Paprika Steen
  directed by Niclas Bendixen
 Checkered Ninja directed by Anders Matthesen and Thorbjørn Christoffersen

2020s 
 2020: Queen of Hearts directed by May el-Toukhy
  directed by 
 Before the Frost directed by Michael Noer
  directed by 
  directed by 
 : Another Round directed by Thomas Vinterberg
 A Perfectly Normal Family directed by 
 Riders of Justice directed by Anders Thomas Jensen
 The Good Traitor directed by Christina Rosendahl
 : Hvor kragerne vender  directed by 
 Margrete: Queen of the North directed by Charlotte Sieling
 A Taste of Hunger directed by Christoffer Boe
 Ternet Ninja 2 directed by Anders Matthesen
 Venuseffekten directed by Anna Emma Haudal

See also 

 Robert Award for Best Danish Film

References

Sources

Further reading

External links 
  

1948 establishments in Denmark
Awards established in 1948
Awards for best film
Danish Film
Lists of films by award